Pedalanka is a village in Guntur district of the Indian state of Andhra Pradesh. It is the located in Bhattiprolu mandal of Tenali revenue division. It forms a part of Andhra Pradesh Capital Region.

Geography 

Government and politics 

Pesarlanka gram panchayat is the local self-government of the village. It is divided into wards and each ward is represented by a ward member.

Education 

As per the school information report for the academic year 2018–19, the village has a total of 3 schools. These schools include one MPP and 2 private schools.

See also 

 List of villages in Guntur district

References 

Villages in Guntur district